Lotfollah Forouzandeh Dehkordi is an Iranian conservative politician who previously served as vice president of Human Management and Development under Mahmoud Ahmadinejad.

References

Living people
Society of Devotees of the Islamic Revolution politicians
Popular Front of Islamic Revolution Forces politicians
1961 births
Vice Presidents of Iran for Parliamentary Affairs
University of Tehran alumni